Giarrusso is an Italian surname.

List of people with the surname 

 Antonio Giarrusso (born 1962), American politician
 Chris Giarrusso, American graphic novel author and illustrator
 Dino Giarrusso (born 1974), Italian television personality and politician
 Evan Giarrusso, American musician
 Mario Giarrusso (born 1965), Italian Senator

See also 

 Gina Russo

Surnames
Surnames of Italian origin
Italian-language surnames